Claudia Maria Buch (also Claudia-Maria Buch; born March 1966) is a German economist who currently serves as Vice President of the Bundesbank. She previously worked as professor at the University of Tübingen and served as a member of the German Council of Economic Experts. Buch worked as scientific director at the Institut für Angewandte Wirtschaftsforschung (Institute of Applied Economic Studies) in Tübingen and as chairperson of the economic council at the Federal Ministry of Economics and Technology. She still teaches at the Otto-von-Guericke-Universität Magdeburg. Her research focuses on regulation and supervision of banking.

Career 
Buch was born in March 1966 in Paderborn. She attended the Gymnasium Theodorianum in Paderborn and subsequently studied economics at the University of Bonn from 1985 to 1991, graduating with a degree as Diplom-Volkswirtin. She was also granted a Master of Business Administration at the University of Wisconsin–Eau Claire after studying there between 1988 and 1989. During 1991 and 1992 she passed the Advanced Studies-Program in International Economic Policy Research at the Kiel Institute for the World Economy (IfW). Since 1992 she had been working there as a scientific assistant in the research group "Central and Eastern Europe". Since 1996 she has worked in the research group "Financial Markets". In 1996 she received a doctoral degree from the University of Kiel and was promoted to professor in 2002. For the IfW she was in charge of the research field "Financial Markets" between 2001 and 2003. She was a visiting scholar at the Salomon Center for the Study of Financial Institutions (New York University), at the University of Michigan (Ann Arbor), at the National Bureau of Economic Research (Cambridge MA), and at the Research Center of the Deutsche Bundesbank (Frankfurt).

In 2004 Buch was appointed professor at the University of Tübingen, holding the chair for International Macroeconomics and Finance with a focus on money and currency. She became director of the Institute of Applied Economic Research (Institut für Angewandte Wirtschaftsforschung Tübingen) in 2005. She does research on regulation and supervision of banking. Since 2004, she has been a member of the economic council of the German Federal Ministry of Economics and Technology, since 2008 as its chair. From 2007 on Buch worked as research professor in the Centre for European Economic Research in Mannheim. In 2011 she was appointed to the scientific council of the European Systemic Risk Board.

Between July and December 2010, Buch served as member of the Expert Council for Exit Strategies in the Financial Sector at the German Federal Ministry of Finance.

Membership in the German Council of Economic Experts, 2012-2014 
In February 2012, at the suggestion of the Federal Minister of Economics and Technology Philipp Rösler, the German government decided to make Buch a member of the German Council of Economic Experts (Sachverständigenrat zur Begutachtung der gesamtwirtschaftlichen Entwicklung) from 1 March 2012. She succeeded Beatrice Weder di Mauro and is the second female member of the council since its foundation in 1963.

In a 2012 interview with Frankfurter Allgemeine Zeitung, Buch held that “Eurobonds in the framework of a political union, with joint control and a surrendering of fiscal powers, would be theoretically an alternative in the long term.” While calling such as solution “politically unrealistic,” she promoted the debt-redemption fund as an alternative to European Central Bank monetization of sovereign debt. The fund, which would mutualize euro-area debt exceeding 60 percent of member states’ economic output in return for strict conditions, would offer a temporary solution until the bloc stabilize its finances, Buch told the newspaper.

Later that year, Buch warned: "If the ECB were to buy even more government bonds, it would assume a redistribution function. The ECB lacks both the mandate and the democratic authority to do so."

In 2013, Buch and Elke König, who headed the Federal Financial Supervisory Authority (BaFin) at the time, were cited by German media as contenders for a post on the Executive Board of the European Central Bank that eventually went to Sabine Lautenschläger.

Between July 2013 and March 2014, Buch served as member of the European Commission’s expert group on debt redemption fund and eurobills, led by Gertrude Tumpel-Gugerell. The expert group was set up with a mandate to deepen the analysis on the possible merits, risks, requirements and obstacles of partial substitution of national issuance of debt through joint issuance in the form of a redemption fund and eurobills.

Vice President of Bundesbank, 2014-present 
In February 2014, the German government nominated Claudia Buch as vice president of the Bundesbank, succeeding Sabine Lautenschläger as the only woman on the central bank’s board; Isabel Schnabel was named Buch’s successor on the Council of Economic Experts shortly after. In her capacity as vice president, Bucher oversees the bank’s activities on Financial Stability, Internal Audit and Statistics. She also accompanies President Jens Weidmann to the sessions of the Governing Council of the European Central Bank. 

At the time, German news media like Der Spiegel considered Buch’s nomination a victory for Finance Minister Wolfgang Schäuble and Chancellor Angela Merkel’s Christian Democratic-led bloc in a power struggle with their Social Democratic coalition partners; Vice Chancellor Sigmar Gabriel, who leads the SPD, reportedly wanted to give the job to Bundesbank board member Joachim Nagel.

Since May 2014, Buch has been a member of the Financial Stability Commission at the Federal Ministry of Finance, representing the Bundesbank.

Other activities

Regulatory agencies
 Bank for International Settlements (BIS), Ex-Officio Chairwoman of the Irving Fisher Committee on Central Bank Statistics (since 2016)
 Bank for International Settlements (BIS), Ex-Officio Member of the Committee on the Global Financial System (since 2014)
 Financial Stability Board (FSB), Ex-Officio Member of the Standing Committee on Assessment of Vulnerabilities (since 2014)
 Economic and Financial Committee, Ex-Officio Member (since 2014)
 Federal Financial Supervisory Authority (BaFin), Ex-Officio Member of the Financial Stability Commission (since 2014)

Scientific institutions 
 Center for Economic and Policy Research (CEPR), Distinguished Fellow (since 2019)
 Goethe University Frankfurt, Member of the University Council (since 2015)
 Halle Institute for Economic Research (IWH), Member of the Scientific Advisory Board (since 2015)
 Rheinisch-Westfälisches Institut für Wirtschaftsforschung (RWI), Member of the Scientific Advisory Board (2011-2013), Member of the Supervisory Board (since 2015)
 International Banking Research Network (IBRN), Co-Director (since 2012)
 Verein für Socialpolitik, Member of the Executive Board (since 2011)
 Max Planck Institute for Tax Law and Public Finance, Member of the Board of Trustees (2014-2016)
 Association of German Economic Research Institutes (ARGE), Deputy Chair of the Board (2013-2014)
 European Systemic Risk Board (ESRB), Member of the Advisory Scientific Committee (2011-2014)
 German Research Foundation (DFG), Member of the Senate (2008-2014)
 Kiel Institute for the World Economy (IfW), Member of the Scientific Advisory Board (2008-2013)
 German National Library of Economics (ZBW), Member of the Scientific Advisory Board (2004-2007)

Editorial boards 

 German Economic Review, Member of the Editorial Board (since 2012)
 Comparative Economic Studies, Member of the Editorial Board (2013-2014)
 Applied Economics Quarterly, Member of the Editorial Board
 Empirica, Member of the Editorial Board

Selected publications

References

External links 
 
 Head of Department. Prof. Dr. Claudia M. Buch University of Tübingen
 Prof. Dr. Claudia M. Buch Sachverständigenrat zur Begutachtung der gesamtwirtschaftlichen Entwicklung

1966 births
Living people
University of Bonn alumni
University of Kiel alumni
Academic staff of the University of Tübingen
University of Wisconsin–Eau Claire alumni
German women academics
German economists
German women economists